The China microcensus (全国1%人口抽样调查) is an intercensal survey to measure the population, in between official censuses.
It is conducted every year that ends in 5.  In 2015, the survey began on November 1st at midnight.  Data are broken down to at least the municipal level, and includes residency (hukou) and ethnicity.

References 

Censuses in China